Gil Gil is a town in the Shire of Buloke, Victoria, Australia.

See also
List of reduplicated Australian place names

References

Towns in Victoria (Australia)